USS SC-48, sometimes styled as either Submarine Chaser No. 48 or S.C.-48, was an  built for the United States Navy during World War I. Like most members of her class, she was not named and known only by her designation.

SC-48 was built at New York Navy Yard in Brooklyn, New York in 1918. She was commissioned 27 March 1918.

On 28 June 1918 SC-48 left New London, Connecticut in a convoy with 17 other submarine chasers, destroyer tender , and several other vessels, bound for France via Bermuda and the Azores. At 06:40 on 5 August, as the convoy neared the Ushant Light, SC-48 spotted a torpedo wake headed for Bridgeport and sounded the alarm. Bridgeport’s evasive action avoided the torpedo, and, despite reports of a periscope sighting, no submarine was ever located or sunk.

After the Armistice, Unit 20 took part in operations to clear the North Sea Mine Barrage through the end of September 1919.

It is unclear if SC-48 remained in commission on 17 July 1920. If she were, she would have received, as part of the new U.S. Navy letter-number scheme, the hull designation of PC-48.

SC-48 was sold on 24 June 1921 to Joseph G. Hitner of Philadelphia. By 1925, the ship had been renamed Stumble Inn 1 and was owned by Clarence Fix and based in Buffalo, New York. The Fix family used this ship for bootlegging and it was seized by the Canadian government which is the last recording of its whereabouts.

Notes

References

External links 
 
 Photo of SC-48 in dry dock in Malta.

 

SC-1-class submarine chasers
Ships built in Brooklyn
World War I patrol vessels of the United States
1918 ships